The Revolutionary Communist Party (Working Class) (Spanish: Partido Comunista Revolucionario-Clase Obrera) was a Maoist communist political party in Peru in the 1970s. Founded as a split faction from Vanguardia Revolucionaria-Político Militar, it was led by Manuel Dammert Ego-Aguirre and Ernie de la Jara y Basombrío.

References 
 Shining and Other Paths, by Steve J. Stern

Communist parties in Peru
Defunct communist parties
Defunct political parties in Peru